John Herbert, nicknamed "Herbert the Pervert", is a fictional character in the animated television series Family Guy, created and voiced by Mike Henry. Herbert is an elderly neighbor of the Griffin family who first appeared in the season 3 episode "To Love and Die in Dixie". A pedohebephile who is attracted to young boys, he harbors unrequited love for Chris Griffin.

Herbert has received mixed reviews from critics, who have expressed varying opinions on the pedophilia-related humor involving the character. Herbert has appeared in various Family Guy merchandise and has made several crossover appearances in The Cleveland Show, a Family Guy spin-off.

Role in Family Guy
Herbert lives in the fictional town of Quahog, Rhode Island, which is modeled after Cranston, Rhode Island. He is an elderly man who dresses in a baby blue bathrobe and utilizes a walking frame due to his age; his dog Jesse is equally elderly and decrepit, being unable to use his hind legs. In his first appearance, "To Love and Die in Dixie" (season 3, 2001), Herbert attempts to seduce Chris inside the house by offering him a popsicle that Herbert insists is in his basement. Despite his pleas, Chris refuses the offer.

In "The Courtship of Stewie's Father" (season 4, 2005), Chris breaks Herbert's window with a baseball and Chris assists Herbert with chores around his house in attempts to pay off the debt, much to Herbert's delight. Herbert later invites Chris to dinner wherein a souvenir photograph of the pair is taken. When Chris gets a new job in "Movin' Out (Brian's Song)" (season 6, 2007), his younger brother Stewie takes over his paper route with Herbert attempting to seduce him much in the same way as he does towards Chris, but is rebuffed by Stewie, who refers to Herbert as a "perverted old freak", insisting he should “piss off” though this only furthers his lust for the infant. In "Play It Again, Brian" (season 6, 2008), Herbert is hired by Peter and Lois to babysit their children Chris, Stewie and Meg. Herbert accepts the offer, claiming he will wear his "snazziest duds", erupting into the song "All I Need is the Girl" (though modified to reflect his unrequited affection for Chris). He claims to have no interest in Meg in large part due to her age and gender, and is disappointed when she is the only one of the three to bathe him. Herbert has a grand-niece, Sandy, whom he helps attract Chris in the style of Cyrano de Bergerac in "Valentine's Day in Quahog" (season 11, 2013).

In "Padre de Familia" (season 6, 2007), Herbert is revealed to have been a World War II veteran as he is shown singing "God Bless the USA" in a local Veterans Day parade, which is furthered in the season 9  (2011) episode "German Guy" in which Herbert reveals he was captured by Wehrmacht forces. Although the Nazi forces initially wished to place Herbert in a prisoner-of-war camp, they instead placed him in Dachau Concentration Camp after discovering several pictures of underage boys in his wallet, prompting them to accuse him of being homosexual. Herbert claims that while imprisoned, SS Lieutenant Franz Schlechtnacht tasked him with sorting the concentration camp's recyclables, which would often lead to soda spilling upon Herbert's hands thus rendering them "kinda sticky".

Herbert has appeared on various occasions in Family Guy spinoffs, such as in various cutaway gags in several episodes of The Cleveland Show. In Laugh It Up, Fuzzball: The Family Guy Trilogy, Herbert appears as Obi-Wan Kenobi.

Production

Herbert was created by writer and voice actor Mike Henry. Henry met Family Guy creator Seth MacFarlane when his brother Patrick was a classmate of MacFarlane's at the Rhode Island School of Design. Henry was invited to write and create characters for Family Guy after the show was picked up. The first character he created was Cleveland Brown, and he later created Herbert.

In the creation process, Herbert was not originally a pedophile; Henry pitched the idea to the writers of the show, leading to the decision to make him one. As with most of the other characters he created, Henry voices Herbert. Henry based Herbert's voice and appearance on an elderly man he met when he worked in a grocery store when he was in high school. In an interview Henry described that man as a sweet person.

Reception
IGN, an American entertainment website, has generally commented positively on him. They pointed out that Herbert is one of the most popular recurring characters in the series, referring to him (with his dog Jesse) as one of the characters that stuck out from the rest. They also noted that one of the reasons Herbert is funny is because of his "soft, high-pitched whistling voice".

Although IGN has praised Herbert in general they have criticized some aspects of him. In their review of "Blue Harvest", a retelling and parody of the 1977 film Star Wars Episode IV: A New Hope, recasting the show's characters into Star Wars roles, IGN criticized the choice of putting Herbert in the role of Obi-Wan Kenobi, stating that it never creates any actual humor. They also criticized the constant use of Herbert, commenting that it was entertaining for the first couple of times, but that it quickly became overused. In their list of "What Else Should Family Guy Make Fun Of?", IGN commented that Herbert would be perfect to play Major Toht and Hogwarts' new Defence Against the Dark Arts instructor should Family Guy ever decide to make parodies of Raiders of the Lost Ark and Harry Potter, respectively.

A February 2015 article written by Hanh Nguyen for TV Guide listed pedophilia among the 12 biggest taboos shown on Family Guy, naming Herbert as the "creepiest of all" references to the disorder. Rowan Kaiser of The A.V. Club criticized the character as an example of how the series occasionally fails in its deliberately offensive humor. He called the character "a black hole of shittiness whose every appearance brings out the worst tendencies of Family Guy", adding that his "appearance brings every episode he's in to a screeching halt". Herbert, along with his dog Jesse, ranked spot number 16 in IGN's "Top 25 Family Guy Characters". Herbert also ranked number five on IGN's "The Cleveland Show Casting Couch", which showed characters that IGN would find interesting to put in The Cleveland Show.

Merchandise
In 2004, the first series of Family Guy toy figurines was released by Mezco Toyz. Each member of the Griffin family and other characters (including Herbert) had their own toy, with the exception of Stewie, of whom two different figures were made. Over the course of two years, four more series of toy figures have been released. Herbert is also featured on the Family Guy: Live in Vegas CD.

See also

List of characters in Family Guy

References

Further reading

Animated human characters
Family Guy characters
Fictional World War II veterans
Fictional pedophiles
Fictional gay males
Fictional characters from Rhode Island
Television characters introduced in 2001
Fictional prisoners of war
Male characters in animated series
American male characters in television